The 2007 Ondo State gubernatorial election was the 6th gubernatorial election of Ondo State. Held on April 14, 2007, the People's Democratic Party nominee Olusegun Agagu won the election, defeating Olusegun Mimiko of the Labour Party.

Results 
Olusegun Agagu from the People's Democratic Party won the election, defeating Olusegun Mimiko from the Labour Party. Registered voters was 1,356,779.

References 

Ondo State gubernatorial elections
Ondo gubernatorial
April 2007 events in Nigeria